A Swedish Love Story is an EP released by  Canadian musician Owen Pallett. Following Heartland, this is Pallett's second release under their own name rather than their previous stage name, Final Fantasy.

Critical reception

The EP was received favorably, generally scoring slightly below its predecessor, Heartland. Pitchfork scored the release at 7.4 out of 10.

Track listing

Personnel

Produced by Rusty Santos and Owen Pallett
Mixed by Rusty Santos
Engineering assistance from Brian Thorn at The Magic Shop
Mastered by Alan Douches at West West Side Music
Published by Open Wallett
Design by Colin Bergh

Owen Pallett – violin, synths, keyboards, vocals
Thomas Gill – guitar
Shahzad Ismaily – drums, electric bass, percussion\
Rob Moose – violin
Nadia Sirota – viola
Clarice Jensen – cello

Artwork
The packaging for the release displays four altered pieces of artwork, credited as follows:

 Scentless Mayweed, 2007, Roger Whitehead
 Carolus Linnaeus in Laponian costume, 1853, Hendrik Hollander
 Linnaea Borealis, 1901, Carl Axel Magnus Lindman
 Untitled, 2009, Agnes Thor

References

2010 EPs
Owen Pallett albums